Robin Cousins,  MBE (born 17 August 1957) is a British former competitive figure skater who was BBC Sports Personality of the Year in 1980. He was the 1980 Olympic champion, the 1980 European champion, a three-time World medalist (1978–1980) and four-time British national champion (1977–1980), winning all of these titles during his amateur career. He followed this with a successful career as a professional figure skater and later starred in ice shows as well as producing several of his own. He is able to spin in either direction, both clockwise and anti-clockwise, which is an unusual skill for a figure skater.

Off the ice, Cousins has commentated on figure skating events for the BBC, and he assumed the position of head judge on ITV's Dancing on Ice show from 2006 to 2014. He has also appeared in theatre productions, including the West End.

Early life
Robin Cousins was born in Bristol to Jo, a secretary, and Fred, a civil servant, who was formerly a goalkeeper for Millwall F.C. Cousins has two older brothers, Martin and Nick.

Cousins first stepped onto the ice at age six at Westover Road Ice Rink while on holiday in Bournemouth. Having enjoyed the experience, he requested lessons for Christmas eighteen months later.

As a young skater, Cousins trained in ice dancing at the same time as singles. His first coach was Pamela Davies. He was later coached by Gladys Hogg at Queens Ice Rink and then by Carlo Fassi.

Cousins left school at the age of sixteen to focus on figure skating. In 1974, he moved alone from Birmingham to London, where he would live in a small apartment that "amounted to a converted closet." He found a job stacking shelves at Whiteley's department store.

Competitive career 

Cousins won his first national title in 1969, aged 12, at novice level. By the age of 14, he was Britain's junior champion, and he made his international debut that same year.

Cousins represented the United Kingdom as an amateur figure skater for eight years. He won the British National Senior Championships for four consecutive years (1977–1980); the free skating portion of the World Championships three times (1978–1980); and the silver medal at the World Championships in 1979 and 1980.

He reached the pinnacle of his amateur career by winning gold medals both in the European Championships and in the Winter Olympic Games in Lake Placid, New York, in 1980. At the Olympics, he was in second place behind Jan Hoffman after the compulsory figures and the short programme. Cousins skated a spectacular long programme, receiving 5.9/6.0 from eight of the nine judges for artistic impression. The silver medalist Hoffmann skated a technically superior performance, but six out of nine judges gave first place to Cousins, giving him the overall win and the gold medal. He was voted BBC Sports Personality of the Year for 1980.

He turned professional in 1980 and went on to win the World Professional Men's Figure Skating Championships twice (1985 and 1987) and was a World Professional singles medalist four times (1986, 1990, 1991, 1992).

Later career 

After turning professional in 1980, Cousins starred in various professional skating shows such as Holiday on Ice and Ice Capades, whilst continuing to be a regular competitor in the World Professional Championships. He hit both the longest Axel jump and the longest back flip on figure skates in the Guinness Book of World Records, reaching 5.81 metres (19 ft 1 in) and 5.48 metres (18 ft) on 16 November 1983.

In 1983, Cousins formed his own ice skating performance company, which toured the world with professional ice shows Electric Ice and Ice Majesty. He has starred in, produced, directed, and/or choreographed many international TV ice shows, including The Nutcracker: A Fantasy on Ice, Sleeping Beauty on Ice, The Wizard of Oz on Ice, Toy Story on Ice, Andrew Lloyd Webber's Starlight Express on Ice, numerous productions for Holiday on Ice, and the movie The Cutting Edge.

Over several years, Cousins has been a regular guest presenter and commentator for BBC Sport, for the European and World Figure Skating Championships and the Winter Olympics. He appeared as the head judge on the show Dancing on Ice in each series from 2006 to 2014, but did not return to the show when it was revived in 2018.

Cousins has also performed on stage. He played the Prince in Rodgers and Hammerstein's Cinderella, Munkustrap in Cats, Frank N Furter in The Rocky Horror Show, Teen Angel in Grease, and Billy Flynn in Chicago in the West End. He has performed pantomime, playing Jack Frost in Santa Clause the return of Jack Frost at the Mayflower Theatre, Southampton. Prior to this he played the Prince in Snow White and the Seven Dwarfs at the Grand Opera House, Belfast.

Cousins has worked with the British synchronized swimming team.

In 2005, he was inducted into the World Figure Skating Hall of Fame.

In March 2016, Cousins joined the Art of the Olympians (AOTO) program.

Personal life

Cousins has undergone a total of eight operations, including a knee replacement in his fifties. His problems began at the 1974 World Championships , where he withdrew before the event started and returned to Bristol to have his first of two meniscus surgeries the second came immediately after the 1977 World Championships when his left knee cartilage ripped and locked in place. By 1980, he had undergone major surgery on both his left and right knees.

In December 1980, Cousins was the subject of This Is Your Life, after being surprised by Eamonn Andrews in his home city of Bristol.

On 10 March 2012, he appeared on the gameshow All Star Family Fortunes with his nephews Tristan, Robin, James and Oliver. He also appeared on the gameshow Tipping Point Lucky Stars in August 2013.

Charity work

Cousins is a significant patron of the Meningitis UK organization and the Starr Trust children's charity in Brighton.

Programmes

Results

Amateur career

Professional career

References

External links 

 Cousins Entertainment
 Robin Cousins skates to Julian Lloyd Webber's music Television appearance, YouTube
"Sleeping Beauty, A Ballet on Ice," featuring Cousins. Program produced by WGBH, made available on the American Archive of Public Broadcasting by the University of Georgia Brown Media Archive

1957 births
BBC Sports Personality of the Year winners
British male single skaters
LGBT figure skaters
English LGBT sportspeople
Gay sportsmen
Figure skaters at the 1976 Winter Olympics
Figure skaters at the 1980 Winter Olympics
Living people
Olympic figure skaters of Great Britain
English Olympic medallists
Olympic gold medallists for Great Britain
Dancing on Ice
Sportspeople from Bristol
Olympic medalists in figure skating
World Figure Skating Championships medalists
European Figure Skating Championships medalists
Medalists at the 1980 Winter Olympics